Bellulia is a genus of moths of the family Erebidae. The genus was erected by Michael Fibiger in 2008.

Species
The kareni species group
Bellulia kareni Fibiger, 2008
The laosiensis species group
Bellulia laosiensis Fibiger, 2008
The nilssoni species group
Bellulia nilssoni Fibiger, 2008
The lacii species group
Bellulia lacii Fibiger, 2008
The galsworthyi species group
Bellulia galsworthyi Fibiger, 2008
Bellulia kononenkoi Fibiger, 2008
The bella species group
Bellulia mariannae Fibiger, 2008
Bellulia parabella Fibiger, 2008
Bellulia bella Fibiger, 2008
Bellulia hanae Fibiger, 2008
Bellulia bibella Fibiger, 2011
The suffusa species group
Bellulia suffusa Fibiger, 2008
The wui species group
Bellulia incognita Fibiger, 2008
Bellulia nepalensis Fibiger, 2008
Bellulia wui Fibiger, 2008
The antemediana species group
Bellulia frateriana Fibiger, 2008
Bellulia antemediana Fibiger, 2008
Unknown species group
Bellulia kendricki Fibiger, 2010
Bellulia basalia Fibiger, 2010
Bellulia postea Fibiger, 2010

References

Micronoctuini
Noctuoidea genera